Jean-Philippe Arrou-Vignod (born 18 September 1958) is a French novelist. He is known for the series Enquête au collège and the Une famille aux petits oignons stories.

Personal life
He was second among six boys in the family.

Career
While beginning his career as a teacher in 1989, he received the First Roman Award for Le Rideau de Nuit.

Works

General

With Gallimard 

 1984: Le rideau sur la nuit (Prix du premier roman)
 1987: Un amateur en sentiments
 1989 : Le cabinet à éclipses
 1990: Le discours des absents
 1995 Le conseil d’indiscipline
 1997: L’homme du cinquième jour (Prix Renaudot des lycéens)
 1999 : Histoire de l’homme que sa femme vient de quitter
 2017: Vous écrivez ?

With other editors 

 1994: La lettre italienne (Belfond)
 1989: L’Afrique intérieure (Arléa)
 1998: Les jours d’avant (Belfond)
 2003: Être heureux (Arléa)
 2006: Ferreira revient (Belfond)

Youth

Enquête au collège series 
Illustrations by Serge Bloch, with Gallimard Jeunesse

 1989 : Le professeur a disparu
 1991 : Enquête au collège
 1993 : P.P.Cul-Vert détective privé
 1995 : Sur la piste de la salamandre
 1998 : Le mystère du Loch Ness
 2000 : Le Club des inventeurs
 2012 : Sa majesté P.P. 1er
 2013 : Le professeur a disparu

Histoires des Jean-Quelque-chose series

 2000 : L'Omelette au sucre
 2003 : Le Camembert volant
 2007 : La Soupe de poissons rouges
 2009 : Des vacances en chocolat
 2013 : La Cerise sur le gâteau
 2016 : Une belle brochette de bananes
 2018: Un petit pois pour six

Other novels 
With Gallimard Jeunesse

 Le Collège fantôme, éd. Gallimard Jeunesse,
 Bon Anniversaire, éd. Gallimard Jeunesse,
 L'invité des CE2, éd. Gallimard Jeunesse
 Agence Pertinax, éd. Gallimard Jeunesse
 Magnus Million et le dortoir des cauchemars, éd. Gallimard Jeunesse,
 Mimsy Pocket et les enfants sans nom, éd. Gallimard Jeunesse

With other editors

 Léo des villes, Léo des champs (Thierry Magnier)
 Le livre dont je ne suis pas le héros (L'École des loisirs)

Picture books

 Rita et Machin series, illustrated by Olivier Tallec
 Louise Titi, illustrated by Soledad
 Le prince Sauvage et la renarde, illustrated by Jean-Claude Götting

Theater 

 2000 : Femmes
 2004 : Compartiment séducteur, staging by Jean-Pierre Bouvier, at the Théâtre du Palais-Royal in Paris

References 

1958 births
Living people
20th-century French novelists
21st-century French novelists
French male novelists
Writers from Bordeaux
Prix Renaudot des lycéens winners